The Office of Financial Research (OFR) is a unit of the United States Department of the Treasury.

OFR may also refer to:
 O.F.R. (album), 1989 album by American band Nitro
 Odd Future Records, record label of Los Angeles-based hip hop collective OFWGKTA
 Office of the Federal Register
 Officer of the Order of the Federal Republic (Nigeria)
 OptimFROG audio codec (uses file extension ".ofr")